The men's 200 metre breaststroke event at the 1952 Olympic Games took place between 31 July and 2 August at the Swimming Stadium. This swimming event used the breaststroke. Because an Olympic size swimming pool is 50 metres long, this race consisted of four lengths of the pool.

Medalists

Results

Heats
16 fastest swimmer advanced to semifinals.

Heat 1

Heat 2

Heat 3

Heat 4

Heat 5

Heat 6

Semifinals
Eight fastest swimmers advanced to final.

Semifinal 1

Semifinal 2

Final

Key: OR = Olympic record

References

External links
Men 200m Breaststroke Swimming Olympic Games 1952 Helsinki (FIN)

Men's breaststroke 200 metre
Men's events at the 1952 Summer Olympics